The Eastchester–Dyre Avenue station (signed as simply Dyre Avenue) is the northern terminal station of the IRT Dyre Avenue Line of the New York City Subway, at Dyre Avenue and Light Street (one block south of East 233rd Street) in the Eastchester neighborhood of the Bronx. It is served by the 5 train at all times.

History 

This station opened on May 29, 1912 as a local station of the New York, Westchester and Boston Railway (NYW&B). It closed on December 12, 1937 when the NYW&B went bankrupt. In 1940, New York City purchased the right of way from the Bronx/Westchester County boundary southward. On May 15, 1941, a shuttle service was implemented between Dyre Avenue and East 180th Street using IRT gate cars. In 1957, a physical connection was made to the IRT White Plains Road Line, and through service was provided.

On February 27, 1962, the Transit Authority announced a $700,000 modernization plan of the Dyre Avenue Line. The plan included the reconstruction of the Dyre Avenue station. At the time, the line was served by 9-car trains during the day, and 3-car shuttles overnight. Between 1954 and 1961, ridership on the line increased by 100%, owing to the development of the northeast Bronx. Ridership at this station increased from 207,250 to 579,474.

The reconstruction of the Dyre Avenue station was rebuilt as part of the plan in 1963–1964. A -long concrete island platform was built atop the line's former northbound express track, and the wooden northbound platform was removed following the project's completion. Two new staircases were installed to the platform. A canopy was installed, covering the center of the platform, in addition to fluorescent lighting. The preexisting entrance to the station was sealed off, replaced by a new entrance on the station's west side. A new change booth and restrooms were installed. Previously, trains had used the northbound side platform as the terminal with the southbound platform unused. Remnants of the side platforms still exist.

Station layout

This station has two tracks and an island platform, and is located on an elevated structure at its southern end and on an embankment at its northern end. The city of Mount Vernon, in Westchester County, is  uphill. The station originally consisted of four tracks flanked by two side platforms. After the line was taken over by the NYCTA, the side platforms were removed, with a small piece of the northbound remaining, and the four tracks were converted to two tracks using the northbound local and southbound express tracks. The island platform was placed over the northbound express trackbed. The NYW&B's southbound local trackbed can still be seen, and is currently used only for an electrical shed on the north end of the bridge, as well as girders holding up two construction trailers used by Metropolitan Transportation Authority crew members over the south end of the bridge. The two tracks extend one train length past the station, and end at bumper blocks.

Exit
The station's only station house is on ground level with doors to the east side of Dyre Avenue on the northeast corner of Light Street. It has a token booth, turnstile bank, and two staircases to the platform.

References

External links 

 
 Station Reporter —  5 Train
 The Subway Nut — Eastchester–Dyre Avenue Pictures
 Dyre Avenue entrance from Google Maps Street View
 Southern end of the platform from Google Maps Street View (during 2017 reconstruction)
 Northern end of the platform from Google Maps Street View (during 2017 reconstruction)

IRT Dyre Avenue Line stations
New York City Subway stations in the Bronx
Railway stations in the United States opened in 1912
Railway stations in the United States opened in 1941
1912 establishments in New York City
Eastchester, Bronx